The lycée Fénelon Sainte-Marie is a private Catholic school located in the 8th arrondissement of Paris. It takes classes from the 6th form to the end of education (8 classes per level).

History
The Fénelon college, named for François Fénelon, was founded in 1869 by priests from the diocese of Paris. Until 1968, it was just for lycée students; it then joined with the Sainte-Marie de Monceau college, run by the Society of Mary (Marianists) and became the Fénelon Sainte-Marie College from Year 11 to the end of schooling. A later merge happened with the Saint-Augustin College, rue de la Bienfaisance, which established primary classes. The establishment then took the name of Fénelon Sainte-Marie Saint-Augustin. Finally, in 1980, with the merger with Sainte-Marie La Madeleine, a girls' school from primary pupils on rue de Monceau and rue de Tocqueville, the school became mixed.

Today, it consists of a college, a lycée and classe préparatoire aux grandes écoles (CGPE), in the sections MP, PC and PSI.

Some classes are located at 47, rue de Naples and others at 24, rue du Général-Foy.

School ranking 

, the lycée was ranked 6th out of 108 at départemental level in terms of quality of teaching, and 12th out of 2277 at national level. The ranking was based on three criteria: the level of bac results, the proportion of students achieving their baccalauréat having spent their last two years at the establishment, and the added value (calculated based on social origin of the students, their age, and their national diploma results).

CPGE rankings 

The national rankings of classes préparatoires aux grandes écoles (CPGE) are calculated based on level of admission of students to the grandes écoles. 
In 2015, L'Étudiant gave the following ranking for courses of 2014 :

Former chaplains 
Jacques Benoit-Gonnin, Bishop of Beauvais, Noyon and Senlis.
Denis Metzinger, curate of the Église Saint-Charles-de-Monceau

Former teachers 
Amos Coulanges, musician

Former students 
Former students by date of birth:
 Théodore Botrel (1868-1925), singer, author, songwriter and composer 
 Pierre Corvol (1941-), doctor and biological researcher
 Jean-Claude Trichet (1942-), French diplomat
 Christophe Dechavanne (1958-), French television and radio presenter and producer 
 Arnaud de Puyfontaine (1964-), President of Vivendi
 Sophie Dudemaine (1965-) under her real name of Sophie Caillabet, French chef
 Fatine Layt (1967-), businesswoman
 Eva Green (1980-), actress
 Dorothée Dupuis (1980-), french art critic
 Daphné Bürki (1980-), television presenter
 Ève Chems de Brouwer (1980-), French actress
 Raphaël Hamburger (1981-), music producer, son of Michel Berger and France Gall
 Clément Bénech (1991-), French writer

Notes and references

External links 
 

Fenelon Sainte-Marie
8th arrondissement of Paris